Hazen Paper Co. v. Biggins, 507 U.S. 604 (1993), was a United States Supreme Court case in which the court held that a disparate treatment claim cannot succeed unless the employee's protected trait had a determinative influence on the employer's decisionmaking.

Background 
Hazen Paper fired Biggins, 62, a few weeks before his service would have reached the required number of years for his pension to vest. Biggins sued Hazen Paper alleging a violation of the Age Discrimination in Employment Act of 1967.

See also 
 List of United States Supreme Court cases
 Lists of United States Supreme Court cases by volume

References

External links 

1993 in United States case law
United States Supreme Court cases of the Rehnquist Court
United States Supreme Court cases